Micropogonias is a genus of fish in the family Sciaenidae (Croakers).

References 
 

Sciaenidae
Taxa named by Charles Lucien Bonaparte

nl:Knorrepos